USS Dennis J. Buckley has been the name of more than one United States Navy ship, and may refer to: 

 , a destroyer escort canceled in 1944
 , a destroyer in commission from 1945 to 1973

United States Navy ship names